E. americanus may refer to:
 Erinus americanus, an ornamental plant species in the genus Erinus
 Esox americanus, a fish species
 Euchirograpsus americanus, a crab species in the genus Euchirograpsus
 Eucosmodon americanus, an extinct mammal species
 Euonymus americanus, a bush species
 Eupeodes americanus, a fly species

See also
 Americanus (disambiguation)